The Far Eastern University – Institute of Education, or simply IE, is the academic institute offering teacher education of the Far Eastern University. It is one of the four earliest institutes that comprised the university in 1934.

In 2016, it was recognized as a Center of Excellence by the Commission on Higher Education (CHED) and Accredited Level IV by the Philippine Association of Colleges and Universities Commission on Accreditation. IE offers undergraduate and postgraduate degree programs in education.

Brief history 
Upon its establishment, the Institute of Education's concentration was in Home Economics; to emphasize the education of women as a driving force in the home. Hence, an integrated program and special courses in Clothing and Textiles, Cookery, and Interior Decoration were among its curricular offerings.

In 1946, the IE was granted Government Recognition for the elementary and high school teacher's certificate. In the same year, the University was empowered to grant the degree of Bachelor of Secondary Education as well as the postgraduate course in Education. In 1956, it was granted Government Recognition #399 for the Bachelor of Elementary program with majors in General Education and Special Education. In 1973, it was granted permission to offer the Master of Arts in Teaching, and four years later, its Doctor of Education program was recognized.

The Institute of Education was granted permission in 1997 to offer 18 units of credits in professional education. In 2001 and 2002, new programs were established – Bachelor of Science in Education major in Sports and Recreational Management (SRM) and the Teacher Certificate Program (TCP).

Under the vertical articulation program of CHED, the administration of the graduate programs in Education was transferred from the Institute of Graduate Studies to the Institute of Education in 2007.

To date, the Institute has graduated thousands who are actively engaged in the teaching profession not only as teachers and professors in public and private institutions of learning here and abroad but also as school administrators, researchers, authors of textbooks and other learning materials, as well as officials of government. FEU - IE takes pride in its participative students, its committed faculty, and its highly qualified leaders.

Degree offerings

Undergraduate programs 

 Bachelor of Elementary Education (BEEd)
 Bachelor of Secondary Education (BSEd)
 Bachelor of Special Needs Education (BSNEd)
 Bachelor of Science in Exercise and Sports Sciences (BSESS)
 Bachelor of Physical Education

Graduate programs 

 Master of Arts in Education major in Curriculum and Instruction
 Master of Arts in Education major in Educational Administration
 Master of Arts in Education major in English Language Teaching
 Master of Arts in Education major in Special Education
 Master in Physical Education
 Doctor of Education major in Curriculum and Instruction
 Doctor of Education major in Educational Management
 Doctor of Education major in Literature and Language Education

Certificate Program 

 Teacher Certificate Program

References

Further reading 

 https://www.feu.edu.ph/wp-content/uploads/2020/04/IE-Prospectus-25.pdf

Far Eastern University
Education schools in the Philippines
Graduate schools in the Philippines